Beebee may refer to:

People
 Helen Beebee, UK professor of philosophy
 Henry Beebee Carrington (1824-1912) U.S. lawyer
 Steve Beebee, UK journalist

Fictional characters
 BeeBee Fenstermaker (character), a fictional character found in the play The Days and Nights of BeeBee Fenstermaker

Pellets
 Ball bearing
 BB gun
 bb bullets

Other uses
 BB Airways (callsign: BEEBEE AIRAWAYS)

See also 
 Bee Bee Bee, U.S. racehorse
 Bee (disambiguation)
 Beebe (disambiguation)
 Bebee (disambiguation)
 Bebe (disambiguation)
 BB (disambiguation)
 Bibi (disambiguation)